Cyriel may refer to:

Cyriel Barbary (1899–2004), the last known Belgian veteran of the First World War
Cyriel Buysse (1859–1932), Flemish naturalist author and playwright
Cyriel Coupe (1918–1998) (pseudonym Anton van Wilderode), Belgian priest, teacher, writer and poet
Cyriel Dessers (born 1994), professional footballer
Cyriel Geerinck (1889–1955), Flemish educator, poet, writer and stage director
Cyriel Omey (1897–1977), Belgian racing cyclist
Cyriel Pennartz (born 1963), Dutch neuroscientist, professor at the University of Amsterdam
Cyriel Vanoverberghe (1912–1995), Belgian racing cyclist
Cyriel Verschaeve (1874–1949), Flemish nationalist priest and writer